Modern Screen was an American fan magazine that for over 50 years featured articles, pictorials and interviews with film stars (and later television and music personalities).

Founding 

Modern Screen magazine debuted on November 3, 1930. Founded by the Dell Company of New York City it initially sold for 10 cents. Modern Screen quickly became popular and by 1933 it had become Photoplay magazine's main competition. It began to brag on its cover that it had "The Largest Circulation of Any Screen Magazine", and Jean Harlow is seen reading a copy of Modern Screen in the 1933 film Dinner at Eight.

During the early 1930s, the magazine featured artwork portraits of film stars on the cover. By 1940 it featured natural color photographs of the stars and was charging 15 cents per issue.

Modern Screen had many different editors in chief over the years, including Richard Heller, who understood the importance of the fan magazine's contribution to movie sales   and Mark Bego, the latter of whom edited the book The Best of Modern Screen   (St. Martin's Press, 1986). The editor most associated with the magazine, however, was Regina Cannon (1900-1992), but her standards for publication were so low that Carl F. Cotter, who wrote 'Forty Hacks of the Fan Mags' (The Coast, 1939), declared her stories to be the worst of the entire lot.

Contributors to the magazine included famed photographer George Hurrell and famed writers like Faith Baldwin. Louella Parsons wrote a column entitled "Good News."

Decline of the magazine

Modern Screen remained a major success through the 1950s but a downturn in movie ticket sales at the end of the decade led to a general sales decline in the magazine. Still  Modern Screen managed to remain popular. On January 3, 1967, The Film Daily declared that 50% of movie ticket sales were influenced by fan magazines such as Modern Screen and Photoplay.  The magazine remained popular through the 1970s, and Lily Tomlin released her 1975 comedy album Modern Scream, a parody of celebrity magazines. In the early 1980s, however, the popularity of general interest celebrity publications like People Magazine proved to be the end of old-fashioned movie fan magazines. Modern Screen became a bimonthly magazine, but in 1985 publication of the magazine ceased.

References

External links

Bimonthly magazines published in the United States
Film magazines published in the United States
Monthly magazines published in the United States
Celebrity magazines published in the United States
Defunct magazines published in the United States
Magazines established in 1930
Magazines disestablished in 1985
Magazines published in New York City